Jefferies Financial Group Inc. is an American financial services company based in New York City and listed on the Fortune 1000.

Investments
The company's major holdings are as follows:

Financial Services
 Jefferies Group (100%) - investment banking & capital markets
 Berkadia Commercial Mortgage (50/50 joint venture with Berkshire Hathaway) - commercial mortgage banking, investment sales and servicing
HomeFed (65% ownership) - Builder of Master Planned Communities, Income Properties, Land Holdings
FXCM (49.9%) - online foreign exchange trading
Foursight Capital (100%) - vehicle finance

Others
 HRG Group (23%) - insurance and consumer products
 Vitesse Energy (96%) - oil and gas exploration and development
 Juneau Energy (98%) - oil and gas exploration and development
 Garcadia Holdings (75%, Joint venture with Ken Garff Automotive Group) - automobile dealerships
 Linkem (57%) - fixed wireless broadband services
 Golden Queen (35%) - a gold and silver mining project
 Idaho Timber (100%) - manufacturing
 National Beef Packing Company (79%) - food producer

History

In 1970, Ian Cumming and Joseph S. Steinberg both graduated in from Harvard Business School and went to work for Carl Marks & Company, an investment bank.

In 1979, they gained control of Talcott National Corporation, sold the James Talcott Factors division, and, in 1980, they renamed the company Leucadia.

In 1984, the company made a $61 million profit on its $77 million investment in Avco Corporation by forcing the sale of the company to Textron.

In 1991, the company acquired insurer Colonial Penn from Florida Power & Light for $150 million.

In 1997, the company sold the life insurance division of Colonial Penn to Conseco for $460 million and sold the auto insurance division of Colonial Penn to GE Capital for $950 million.

In 1998, the company sold Charter National Life Insurance and Intramerica Life Insurance to Allstate.

In 2002, the company received a 44% stake in WilTel Communications Group as a result of a bankruptcy reorganization.

In May 2003, the company made an offer to acquire the remaining shares of WilTel Communications Group that it did not already own.

In August 2003, after increasing its offer, the company acquired the remaining shares of  WilTel Communications Group.

In September 2003, the company acquired RehabWorks.

In January 2004, the company financed Pershing Square Capital Management, a hedge fund managed by Bill Ackman.

In July 2004, the company sought, but failed, to buy a controlling stake in MCI Communications. In September 2004, the company sold its stake in MCI for a $20 million profit.

In 2005, the company sold WilTel Communications Group to Level 3 Communications for a $180 million profit.

In 2007, the company acquired ResortQuest International from Gaylord Hotels for $35 million.

In 2009, the company entered into a 50/50 joint venture with Berkshire Hathaway called Berkadia, which acquired the North American loan origination and servicing business of Capmark Financial Group.

In 2010, the company sold ResortQuest International to Wyndham Worldwide for $56 million in cash.

In 2011, the company acquired a 79% interest in National Beef Packing Company for $867.9 million.

In 2012, the company proposed building a $3 billion syngas facility in south Chicago to convert coal and petroleum waste into natural gas; however, the plant never received legislative approval.

In 2013, the company merged with Jefferies Group and Richard Handler became chief executive officer of the company.

In 2015, the company made an investment in FXCM after FXCM suffered losses due to the appreciation of the Swiss Franc.

In 2016, the company restructured its investment in FXCM.

In May 2018, the company was renamed Jefferies Financial Group.

References

External links

Companies listed on the New York Stock Exchange
Publicly traded companies based in New York City
Financial services companies of the United States